Polygonum agreste is a species of flowering plant in the family Polygonaceae, native to Uzbekistan. It was first described by Georgji Sumnevicz in 1940.

(Polygonum agreste Sumner is a different species, and is a synonym of Polygonum aviculare.)

References

agreste
Flora of Uzbekistan
Plants described in 1940